means "the daughter of a cat". The literal translation, however, is actually "cat daughter" or "cat girl"; "neko" means "cat" in Japanese and "musume" means "daughter" or "girl". Nekomusume can refer to:

 A specific transformation of the folkloric Bakeneko
 Catgirls, female anime characters or cosplayers with nekomimi (cat ears) in Japanese popular culture
 Neko-Musume, a character in manga and anime series GeGeGe no Kitarō